Wolfgang Karl Weyrauch (1907–1970) was a German-Peruvian malacologist and entomologist.

Life
Weyrauch was born on December 7, 1907, in Elberfeld, Germany. He received his PhD in Zoology in 1929 from the University of Berlin with a thesis on insect neurophysiology. From 1928 to 1929, he was an assistant of Richard Hesse, and from 1931 to 1943 he worked for the German Council of Scientific Research doing field studies in entomology and ecology.

In 1938, he worked as an entomologist at the agricultural experimental station (Estación Agrícola de La Molina) in Lima, Peru. At the time of World War II, he moved to Texas, where he did field work in entomology and malacology. In 1946, he was at the Estación experimental Agrícola de Tingo María in Lima. From 1948 on, he worked for the Universidad Mayor de San Marcos in Lima as a Professor of zoology and Genetics at the Museo Nacional de Historia. In addition, he was from 1959 to 1961 Professor of agricultural zoology at the Pontificia Universidad Católica del Lima. In 1962, he went to Argentina and became professor at the Instituto Miguel Lillo in Tucumán. He died of a heart attack in 1970.

Works
Weyrauch studied land and freshwater gastropods of South America, mainly taxa belonging to the families Camaenidae, Charopidae,  Clausiliidae, Endodontidae, Helicinidae, “Hydrobiidae”, Orthalicidae, Pupillidae, Scolodontidae, Subulinidae, and Urocoptidae. He left behind many type specimens in museums, of which he published no original description. He was the author of 198 molluscan names.

Species named in his honor
The following gastropod species were named after Weyrauch:
Bostryx weyrauchi 
Neopetraeus weyrauchi 
Thaumastus weyrauchi 
Nenia weyrauchi 
Incapora weyrauchi 

Also, a species of snake is named after Weyrauch:
Leptotyphlops weyrauchi 

A species of wasp is also named after Weyrauch:
Polistes weyrauchorum Willink, 1964

Two species of harvestmen are also named after Weyrauch:
Chusgonobius weyrauchi Roewer, 1952
Andrescava weyrauchi Roewer, 1957

References

Further reading
Aguilar P (1970). "Prof. Dr. Wolfgang K. Weyrauch, 1907-1970". Revista Peruana de Entomologia 13: 3-4.
Breure ASH (1975). "Description of a collecting trip in Peru, Ecuador, Colombia and Venezuela". De Kreukel 11 (7): 83-116. 
Willink A (1999). "Biografias Lilloanas". Revista de la Sociedad Entomológica Argentina 58 (3-4): 3-10. 
Zilch A (1970). "Wolfgang Karl Weyrauch (1907-1970)". Mittheilungen der Deutschen Malakozoologischen Gesellschaft 2 (18): 226-236.

German entomologists
German malacologists
1970 deaths
1907 births
20th-century German zoologists
Academic staff of the National University of San Marcos